Elaine Walker is a composer, electronic musician and author born in 1969. She wrote a physics/philosophy book, “Matter Over Mind: Cosmos, Chaos, and Curiosity” (2016). She specializes in microtonal music, including founding ZIA, an all electronic band, and performing with D.D.T. She has performed with Number Sine. She describes: "I compose microtonal music strictly by ear and leave it to others to analyze, so you won't find ratios or mathematics here."

Life

Raised in southern New Mexico "by two loving mathematicians, Elaine grew to love the desert in all of its glory and wide openness". Her father was Dr. Elbert A. Walker.

Walker has a Music Synthesis Production degree from Berklee College of Music (1991) and a master's degree in Music Technology from New York University (2001). In her Masters Thesis she developed a new kind of music compositional theory called "Chaos Melody Theory based on recursive chaos mathematics". 
She was a musical director for Pokémon with 4Kids Entertainment, and later GoGoRiki. Each summer she is Education and Public Outreach Coordinator for the NASA-Haughton-Mars Project. Her Martians video was recorded there in 2003 (commissioned by NASA) 
to promote the prospect of humans living on Mars.

Work

Solo work
Walker had already released her debut studio album titled Blue Cartoon in 1989, before moving to work as ZIA.

Walker returned to solo work and self-released two studio albums, 2006's Martians and 2011's Drum 'n' Space. Walker released her second EP in 2018 titled Four-Momentum, which was followed a year later by her sixth album Trapezoid.

Composition
She has composed using various equal temperaments, including the Bohlen–Pierce scale: Stick Men (1991), Love Song, and Greater Good (2011). Other tunings include 10, 16, 17, 19 equal temperament and 20.

Elaine Walker's solo music includes many space or alien themed titles, including "Red Dreams", "Martian Nation", 
"Humans and Martian Machines", "The Tenth Planet", and Frontier Creatures. She composed the theme to Yuri's Night.

ZIA

In 1991, she formed the band ZIA, named after the Zia sun symbol featured in the Flag of New Mexico. In the early years ZIA has also performed with Emergency Broadcast Network, A Flock of Seagulls, and Marilyn Manson in the Boston area.

ZIA were an American industrial rock band based out of New York City. ZIA released six albums: Zia v1.2 (1992), Zia v1.5 (1994), Big Bang! (2000), Martians (2006), Drum 'n' Space (2011) and Trapezoid (2019)

In 1989 Walker recorded her first song, titled "Waiting for the Winds (Woza Moya)", as ZIA and in 1989 released it on the Zulu Hits various artists compilation by Celluloid Records. She recorded Zia v1.2 in 1992 and brought in a band for Zia v1.5, her second release. Fifth Colvmn Records  released the EP Shem in 1996, and the composition "Space-Time" was released on the label's Echo compilation. The album showcased her atonal composition technique with electronic music.

Discography
 Blue Cartoon (1989)
 Mars (2000)

As ZIA
Studio albums
 Zia v1.2 (1992, Blue Cartoon)
 Zia v1.5 (1994, Blue Cartoon)
 Big Bang! (2000, Zia/Chaos Control)
 Martians (2006)
 Drum 'n' Space (2011)
 Trapezoid (2019)
 No Terrestrial Road (2020)

Extended plays
 SHEM (1996, Fifth Colvmn)
 Four-Momentum (2018)

Compilation appearances
 Zulu Hits (1989, Celluloid)
 Echo (1996, Fifth Colvmn)
 Boston Elektro 101 (1996, Sinless)
 Mind/Body Compilation Volume 3 (1996, Atomic Novelties/DIY)
 Musical Sampler 1998 (1998, Deus ex Musica)
 Movement 1998 (1998, Deus ex Musica)
 Shades of Grey (1998, Grinding Into Emptiness)
 She: A Female Trip-Hop Experience (2001, Sonic Images Electronica)
 Bloc Party - Tapes (2013, !K7)

See also
Fifth Colvmn Records
Richard Boulanger
Space advocacy

Sources

External links
"Elaine Walker's site", ZIAspace.com.
 ZIA at Bandcamp
"YouTube.com/miselaineeous", YouTube channel with historical and most up-to-da ZIA videos, theory, vertical keyboards, philosophy, life 
 “Matter Over Mind: Cosmos, Chaos, and Curiosity” hardcover
Africa, Chris (2004). "Pro-Space Activist Elaine Walker", Ultraverse.
"Elaine Walker", Discogs.com.
"Zia Biography", AllMusic.com''.
 
 
 

American women composers
21st-century American composers
American electronic musicians
American industrial musicians
Microtonal musicians
Space advocates
Year of birth missing (living people)
Living people
21st-century American women musicians
21st-century women composers